is a train station on the Kita-Osaka Kyuko Railway (which links directly into the Osaka Municipal Subway Midosuji Line) located in Suita, Osaka, Japan.

Line
Kita-Osaka Kyuko Railway Namboku Line (Station Number: M09)

Layout
There is an island platform with two tracks between "Shin-Midosuji".

Surroundings
Momoyama Park
AZALL Momoyamadai
Japan National Route 423 (Shin-Midosuji)
Hankyu Oasis
Momoyamadai Depot
Bus stops for Hankyu Bus Co., Ltd. (for Suita and Toyonaka)
Expressway bus stop (Senri New Town)

Stations next to Momoyamadai

Railway stations in Japan opened in 1970
Railway stations in Osaka Prefecture